Jeffrey Katzenberg (born December 21, 1950) is an American film producer and media proprietor. He became well known for his tenure as chairman of Walt Disney Studios from 1984 to 1994. After departing Disney, he was a co-founder and CEO of DreamWorks Animation, where he oversaw the production of such animated franchises as Shrek, Madagascar, Kung Fu Panda, and How to Train Your Dragon. He has since founded a new media and technology company called WndrCo and was the founder of Quibi, a defunct short-form mobile video platform.

Katzenberg has also been involved in politics. With his active support of Hillary Clinton and Barack Obama, he was called "one of Hollywood's premier political kingmakers and one of the Democratic Party's top national fund-raisers."

Early life 
Katzenberg was born in New York City, to a Jewish family, the son of Anne, an artist, and Walter Katzenberg, a stockbroker. He attended the Ethical Culture Fieldston School, graduating in 1969. When he was 14, Katzenberg volunteered to work on John Lindsay's successful New York mayoral campaign. He quickly received the nickname "Squirt" and attended as many meetings as he could.

Professional career

Paramount Pictures 
Katzenberg began his career as an assistant to producer David V. Picker, then in 1974 he became an assistant to Barry Diller, the chairman of Paramount Pictures. Diller moved Katzenberg to the marketing department, followed by other assignments within the studio, until he was assigned to revive the Star Trek franchise, which resulted in Star Trek: The Motion Picture (1979). He continued to work his way up and became president of production under Paramount's president, Michael Eisner.

The Walt Disney Studios 
In 1984, Michael Eisner became chief executive officer (CEO) at The Walt Disney Company. Eisner brought Katzenberg with him to take charge of Disney's motion picture division. Katzenberg was responsible for reviving the studio which, at the time, ranked last at the box office among the major studios. He focused the studio on the production of adult-oriented comedies through its Touchstone Pictures banner, including films such as Down and Out in Beverly Hills (1986), Three Men and a Baby (1987) and Good Morning, Vietnam (1987). By 1987, Disney had become the number-one studio at the box office. Katzenberg also oversaw Touchstone Television, which produced such hit television series as The Golden Girls and Home Improvement. On February 1, 1989, Katzenberg co-founded Hollywood Pictures with Michael Eisner.

Katzenberg was also charged with turning around Disney's ailing Feature Animation unit, creating some intrastudio controversy when he personally edited twelve minutes out of a completed Disney animated feature, The Black Cauldron (1985), shortly after joining the company. Under his management, the animation department eventually began creating some of Disney's most critically acclaimed and highest grossing animated features. These films include The Great Mouse Detective (1986), Who Framed Roger Rabbit (1988), Oliver and Company (1988), The Little Mermaid (1989), Beauty and the Beast (1991)—which was the first animated feature to be nominated for an Academy Award for Best Picture—Aladdin (1992), and The Lion King (1994) which happened in spite of Katzenberg.

In addition, Katzenberg also sealed the deal that created the highly successful partnership between Pixar and Disney and the deal that brought Miramax Films into Disney.

Concerns arose internally at Disney, particularly from Roy E. Disney, about Katzenberg taking too much credit for the success of Disney's early 1990s releases. In 1993, Katzenberg had lobbied to become Eisner's second in command, which would have meant moving Frank Wells from president to vice chairman, to which Eisner replied that Wells would feel "hurt" in that scenario and then, according to Katzenberg, assured him, "If for any reason Frank is not here ... you are the number-two person and I want you to have the job." After Wells died in a helicopter crash in 1994, Eisner assumed Wells' duties instead of promoting Katzenberg to the vacated position of president. Eisner recalled that "Roy E. Disney [ Walt Disney's nephew and a force on Disney's board who Eisner says 'could be a troublemaker'], who did not like him at all I forget the reason, but Jeffrey probably did not treat him the way that Roy would have wanted to be treated said to me, 'If you make him the president, I will start a proxy fight.'" Disney board member Stanley Gold said Katzenberg had been brought low by "his ego and almost pathological need to be important." Tensions between Katzenberg, Eisner and Disney resulted in Katzenberg being forced to resign from the company that October. Katzenberg launched a lawsuit against Disney to recover money he felt he was owed and settled out of court for an estimated $250 million.

DreamWorks SKG 

Later in 1994, Katzenberg co-founded DreamWorks SKG with Steven Spielberg and David Geffen, with Katzenberg taking primary responsibility for animation operations. He was also credited as producer or executive producer on the DreamWorks animated films The Prince of Egypt (1998), The Road to El Dorado, Chicken Run and Joseph: King of Dreams (all in 2000), Shrek in 2001, Spirit: Stallion of the Cimarron in 2002, Sinbad: Legend of the Seven Seas in 2003 and Shrek 2 in 2004.

After DreamWorks Animation suffered a $125 million loss on the traditionally animated Sinbad: Legend of the Seven Seas (2003), Katzenberg believed that telling traditional stories using traditional animation was a thing of the past, and the studio switched to all computer-generated animation. Since then, most of DreamWorks' animated feature films have been successful financially and critically with several Annie Awards and Academy Awards nominations and wins.

DreamWorks Animation 
In 2004, DreamWorks Animation (DWA) was spun off from DreamWorks as a separate company headed by Katzenberg in an IPO and has recorded mostly profitable quarters since then.

The live-action DreamWorks movie studio was sold to Viacom in December 2005. In 2008, the live-action DreamWorks studio again became an independent production company, releasing its films through Disney.

In 2006, Katzenberg made an appearance on the fifth season of The Apprentice.  He awarded the task winners an opportunity to be character voices in Over the Hedge.

Katzenberg has been an industry leader in promoting digital 3D production of film, calling it "the greatest advance in the film industry since the arrival of color in the 1930s." When Katzenberg appeared on The Colbert Report on April 20, 2010, he confirmed that from now on "every single movie" that DreamWorks Animation produced would be in 3D and gave Stephen Colbert a pair of new 3D glasses.

It was reported that Katzenberg receives an airfare allowance of $1.5 million per year, which was the most of all media-company CEOs.

Following NBCUniversal's acquisition of DreamWorks Animation in 2016 for $3.8 billion, Katzenberg left his position of CEO at DWA and has been named chairman of DreamWorks New Media, consisting of DWA's interests in AwesomenessTV and Nova. However, he stepped down from his DreamWorks career for unknown reasons.

WndrCo 
In January 2017, reports surfaced that he had raised nearly $600 million from investors for a new venture called WndrCo, which will invest in new media and technology companies. Katzenberg wants to grow WndrCo into a company similar to IAC, founded by his former mentor, Barry Diller.

Katzenberg says WndrCo aims to reinvent TV for mobile devices.

Quibi
In late 2018, Katzenberg announced his new video streaming platform, Quibi, created in partnership with former eBay CEO Meg Whitman. The platform specialized in original, short-form content designed for smartphones. Whitman was hired as the company's CEO and first employee. Katzenberg and Whitman had sold the idea as a mobile-based Netflix. Their investors included Disney, NBCUniversal, Sony, Viacom, and AT&T's newly-rebranded WarnerMedia. In late 2020, Quibi shut down after just over seven months of operation due to a lack of interest and profitability. Of the initial $1.65 billion raised, Quibi only returned $350 million. On October 22, 2020, Katzenberg told the employees to listen to the song "Get Back Up Again" from the movie Trolls as he announced that the employees would be fired.

Political activities 

Katzenberg is a longtime supporter of Barack Obama. Reportedly "smitten" by Obama's speech at the 2004 Democratic National Convention, Katzenberg pledged his full support to Obama in 2006 if he decided to run for president. During his campaign, Obama praised Katzenberg for his "tenacious support and advocacy since we started back in 2007."

Katzenberg has been an avid fund-raiser for Obama, doing so while much of Hollywood was still supporting the Clintons. His fund-raising prowess has reportedly allowed him to become an "informal liaison" between Hollywood and the White House. Katzenberg co-hosted a fund-raiser for President Obama at the home of actor George Clooney in May 2012. Katzenberg said that the event raised almost $15 million, which would make it the most profitable presidential fund-raiser in history. It was reported that Obama campaign officials were not happy about some of the requests that Katzenberg had made. In particular, they were bothered that Katzenberg, who reportedly had made himself "indispensable to Obama", required that the President spend time talking at each of the 14 tables.

When the details of Oriental DreamWorks emerged, Jennifer Rubin noted that the Obama Administration's potential involvement in the deal would not be an issue if not for Katzenberg's May fund-raiser for Obama and his "huge campaign donations." It was reported that Katzenberg was Obama's top "bundler", who, along with Andy Spahn, had collected at least $6.6 million in combined donations for both of Obama's campaigns. In an MSNBC interview about the donations, Nicholas Confessore noted Katzenberg's desire to build movie studios in China, saying that he would need help from the Obama administration to get this done and that "[e]veryone has interests at stake." Bill Allison of the Sunlight Foundation suggested that Katzenberg's long history of financial support for Obama may have influenced the movie deal being "fast-track[ed]" by the White House, noting that DreamWorks Animation "never registered to lobby the federal government."

It was reported that Obama arrived in Los Angeles on October 7, 2012, where he joined Bill Clinton at Katzenberg's Beverly Hills home for a private meeting with several deep-pocketed Democratic donors. Obama's campaign indicated the meeting was to thank supporters, but some members of the campaign finance committee said that it involved the pro-Obama PAC Priorities USA Action. Members of the White House press corps who had traveled to California with Obama were kept in the garage of Katzenberg's mansion and one reporter called the meeting "unusual". Katzenberg, who had previously donated $2 million to the pro-Obama PAC Priorities USA Action, donated an additional $1 million in October 2012. He donated $1 million to the Super PAC Priorities USA, which supported Hillary Clinton in the 2016 presidential race. In October 2016, he hosted a $100,000-per-person fund-raiser at his Beverly Hills residence with President Barack Obama as the main attraction.

In 2018, following the Stoneman Douglas High School shooting, Katzenberg pledged $500,000 to the March for Our Lives gun-control demonstration.

SEC investigation 

The Securities and Exchange Commission launched an investigation in April 2012 into accusations that Katzenberg had bribed Chinese officials in an effort to obtain distribution rights, as Joe Biden was negotiating a deal to increase film quotas.

SOPA/PIPA 
Katzenberg took a leading role in pushing the Stop Online Piracy Act (SOPA); Hollywood reportedly saw piracy as "an existential threat". When the White House announced its opposition to the bill in January 2012, Chris Dodd, the former Senator and head of the Motion Picture Association of America, the film industry's lobbying organization, contacted Katzenberg to obtain more information about the president's plans. When Dodd reportedly asked him to intervene, Katzenberg declined, but "sought to soothe hurt feelings and lay the groundwork for a deal more friendly to Hollywood". Katzenberg's office contacted Obama and urged him to contact other studio chiefs in order to reaffirm their support. Obama would take the advice, making Katzenberg one of the few Hollywood executives working on brokering a compromise with Silicon Valley.

Special awards 

The Academy of Motion Picture Arts and Sciences announced in September 2012, that the Jean Hersholt Humanitarian Award would be presented to Katzenberg at the Oscar ceremony in 2013, in acknowledgment of his role in "raising money for education, art and health-related causes, particularly those benefiting the motion picture industry."

During the 2017 Cannes Film Festival, the jury awarded Katzenberg an honorary Palme d'Or, the festival's highest prize. Katzenberg compared the distinction to the earlier Academy recognition.

Personal life 

Katzenberg married Marilyn Siegel, a kindergarten teacher, in 1975. They have twin children, Laura and David, born in 1983. David is a television producer and director.

Katzenberg and his wife have been highly active in charitable causes. They donated the multimillion-dollar Katzenberg Center to Boston University's College of General Studies, citing that the school gave their two children the "love of education." They also donated the Marilyn and Jeffrey Katzenberg Center for Animation at the University of Southern California.

In addition to serving as Chairman of the Board for the Motion Picture and Television Fund Foundation, Katzenberg sits on the boards or serves as a trustee of AIDS Project Los Angeles, American Museum of the Moving Image, California Institute of the Arts, Cedars-Sinai Medical Center, Geffen Playhouse, Michael J. Fox Foundation for Parkinson's Research, University of Southern California School of Cinematic Arts and The Simon Wiesenthal Center.  Together with DreamWorks Animation, Katzenberg founded the DreamWorks Animation Academy of Inner-City Arts in 2008. In recognition of his efforts, Katzenberg received the 85th Jean Hersholt Humanitarian Award at the 2012 American Academy of Motion Picture Arts and Sciences Governors Awards Presentation on December 1 at The Ray Dolby Ballroom at Hollywood & Highland Center.

Katzenberg has an estimated worth of US$900 million (2016) and is reported to have donated over $3.5 million in political contributions since 1979: 33% ($1.171+ million) to Democrats, 66% ($2.33+ million) to special interest groups without party affiliations, and less than 1% ($7,000) to Republicans.

He was awarded the Honorary degree of Doctor of Arts from Ringling College of Art and Design on May 2, 2008.

Filmography

Films

Television

References

External links 

 

 
1950 births
Living people
20th-century American businesspeople
21st-century American businesspeople
American chief executives
American chief executives in the media industry
American film producers
American film studio executives
American film production company founders
American gun control activists
20th-century American Jews
American philanthropists
Businesspeople from New York City
California Democrats
DreamWorks Animation people
American mass media company founders
Disney executives
Ethical Culture Fieldston School alumni
Jean Hersholt Humanitarian Award winners
New York (state) Democrats
Paramount Pictures executives
United States National Medal of Arts recipients
Walt Disney Animation Studios people
21st-century American Jews